A129 may refer to :
 A129 road (England), a road in Essex connecting Shenfield and Hadleigh 
 Agusta A129 Mangusta, a 1983 Italian attack helicopter